XXL is a Norwegian sporting goods retailer with brick and mortar stores and online stores in the Nordics and Austria. XXL is the largest and fastest growing sports retailer by revenue in the Nordic region. XXL's headquarter is located in Oslo, Norway. The company is listed on the Oslo Stock Exchange. XXL opened its first store in central Oslo in 2001 and online store in 2002.

References

Retail companies of Norway
Sporting goods retailers
Retail companies established in 2001
Companies based in Oslo
Companies listed on the Oslo Stock Exchange